The 1944–45 Luxembourg National Division was the 31st season of top level association football in Luxembourg.

Quarterfinal

Semifinal

Final

References
Luxembourg - List of final tables (RSSSF)

Luxembourg National Division seasons
Lux
1944–45 in Luxembourgian football